The following is a list of awards and nominations received by Thomas Jane throughout his acting career.

Nominations and wins

Florida Film Critics Circle Awards

Golden Globe Awards

SAG Awards

Satellite Awards

Shorty Awards

Awards

By film/TV series

Notes

External links

Jane, Thomas